The South Fremantle Football Club Hall of Fame was established in 2011 to recognise and enshrine individuals who have made an outstanding
contribution to the club's history. In opening the club's Hall of Fame, then club president Hayden Raitt gave the following address:

South Fremantle’s illustrious football history is one littered with many outstanding events, feats of champion footballers, champion teams and selfless dedication by committed coaches, officials and administrators. All have kept our great club at the forefront of football in Western Australia for over a century.

The first intake, held at a club dinner function on 21 July 2011, focused on the contributions of players, coaches, officials and administrators across the first 80 years of the club's history. Subsequent intakes to the Hall of Fame have been held in 2015 and 2021.

There are currently 88 members in the South Fremantle Hall of Fame. In this article, they are divided into three broad categories: Legends, Players and Officials.

 Members with names in bold are also in the Western Australian Football Hall of Fame
 Members with an asterisk * next to their names are also in the Australian Football Hall of Fame

Legends

Players

Officials

See also
 Western Australian Football Hall of Fame

References

External links
 
 

South Fremantle Football Club
Australian rules football museums and halls of fame
2011 establishments in Australia